Broadway Soul is an album by saxophonist Sonny Stitt recorded in 1965 and released on the Colpix label.

Reception

Scott Yanow of Allmusic states, "this set is far from essential. However Stitt's solos generally uplift the material and the saxophonist's fans will want the collector's item".

Track listing 
 "Hello, Dolly!" (Jerry Herman) - 2:59
 "Better All the Time" (Sammy Fain, Marilyn Bergman, Alan Bergman) - 3:35
 "You'd Better Love Me" (Hugh Martin, Timothy Gray) - 3:23
 "Night Song" (Lee Adams, Charles Strouse) - 5:09
 "A Room Without Windows" (Ervin Drake) - 3:27
 "Gimme Some" (Adams, Strouse) - 5:11
 "Loads of Love" (Richard Rodgers) - 2:15
 "If I Gave You" (Martin, Gray) - 5:05

Personnel 
Sonny Stitt - alto saxophone, tenor saxophone
Thad Jones, Ernie Royal - trumpet
Jimmy Cleveland - trombone
Budd Johnson, Jerome Richardson, Zoot Sims - tenor saxophone
Walter Bishop, Jr., Roger Kellaway - piano
Milt Hinton - bass
Osie Johnson - drums

References 

1965 albums
Colpix Records albums
Sonny Stitt albums